Erkuai is a type of rice cake particular to the Yunnan Province of southwest China.

The name literally means "ear piece," a reference to the shape of one of its common forms. It is often served stir-fried with vegetables, and málà (麻辣) sauce, which is a mixture of dried red chilis, Sichuan pepper, and salt.

It is also sold as the popular street food kăo ĕrkuāi (烤饵块) or shāo ěrkuāi grilled and rolled around a yóutiáo (strip of fried dough), with sweet or savory condiments added, making a rolled-up snack resembling a Mexican burrito. The sweet type contains a sweet brown sauce and peanuts, while the savory type is spread with lǔfǔ and bean sprouts, and various other toppings. Kăo ĕrkuāi is particularly popular in the tourist area of Dali.

Its peculiar name has led to it being called one of the Eighteen Oddities in Yunnan.

See also
 Yunnan cuisine

References

Yunnan cuisine
Chinese rice dishes
Rice cakes